, or Tale of the Soldier, as it was first published, is an hour-long 1918 theatrical work to be "read, played and danced" by three actors, one or more dancers, and a septet of instruments. Its music is by Igor Stravinsky, its libretto, in French, by Swiss writer Charles Ferdinand Ramuz; the two men conceived it together, their basis being the Russian tale The Runaway Soldier and the Devil in the collection of Alexander Afanasyev.

Music
Histoire du soldat is scored for clarinet, bassoon, cornet (often played on trumpet), trombone, percussion, violin and double bass. The music is rife with changing time-signatures and for this reason is commonly, though not always, performed with a conductor.

Roles
Ramuz relates the parable of a soldier who trades his violin to the Devil in return for vast economic gain by means of three actors: the Narrator, who both narrates and impersonates several minor characters; the Devil, who assumes various guises; and the Soldier himself, Joseph, from no army identified. A dancer has the usually silent role of the Princess.

First performances
Stravinsky was helped greatly in the work's production by Swiss philanthropist Werner Reinhart, who sponsored and underwrote its premiere. In gratitude Stravinsky dedicated Histoire to him, and gave him the manuscript.

Histoire du soldat was first performed on 28 September 1918 in Lausanne, conducted by Ernest Ansermet. British conductor Edward Clark, who was a friend and champion of Stravinsky and a former assistant to Ansermet at the Ballets Russes, led the British premiere in 1926 in Newcastle upon Tyne and gave three fully staged performances in London the following July.

Suites
Reinhart continued his support of Stravinsky's work in 1919 by funding a series of concerts of his recent chamber music. These included a suite of five numbers from Histoire du soldat arranged for clarinet, violin and piano, in a nod to Reinhart who was an amateur clarinetist. This was first performed on 8 November 1919, also in Lausanne, long before a larger suite employing all seven original instruments became available to other musicians.

Structure
The work's sixteen narrative and instrumental sections alternate and are not intended to overlap.

Part 1 
Joseph Duprat, the Soldier, is walking exhausted toward his hometown on a 15-day leave, pack in tow. (Marche du soldat / The Soldier's March). He rests by a stream. From his pack he takes out his lucky St. Joseph medallion, then a mirror, next a picture of his fiancée, and finally his violin. He begins to play. (Petits airs au bord du ruisseau / Airs by the Stream). The Devil appears, disguised as an old man carrying a butterfly net. Joseph does not notice him but continues to play. The Devil sneaks up from behind and startles him.

The Devil asks Joseph to sell him his violin. When Joseph refuses he offers him a book that he says will lead to untold wealth. Joseph does not understand the book, but the Devil convinces him it is worth more than his cheap violin. Joseph realizes the book contains events that happen in the future. He accepts the Devil's offer to spend three days at the Devil's home in great luxury to learn about the book and teach the Devil the violin. After this term the Devil takes Joseph the rest of his way home. (Reprise: Marche du soldat).

But once in his hometown Joseph notices something strange: everyone runs away as they see him. He arrives at his fiancée's house only to find her with husband and children. Finally he realizes that three years, not three days, have passed and that his former neighbors and friends think he's a ghost. (Pastorale).

Joseph sees the Devil in disguise as a cattle merchant and confronts him. The Devil tries to calm Joseph by reminding him of the book's power: Joseph started off as a peddler but with the knowledge gained from the book quickly amassed wealth. The Soldier realizes this material wealth means nothing. All he wants is what he had before, the things everyone else has. (Reprise: Petits airs). Agitated, he leafs through the book for a solution, in vain.

The Devil arrives, now disguised as an old woman peddler. She offers for sale a lucky medallion, a mirror, a picture of a woman, and then a violin. Joseph moves to buy the violin, but when she hands it over he finds he can no longer play: it makes no sound. (Reprise: Petits airs). He hurls it away and tears up the book.

Part 2 
Joseph leaves his home with nothing and marches through town. (Reprise: Marche du soldat). He arrives at an inn where he hears the news that the king's daughter is sick, and whoever can raise her from her bed will be given her hand in marriage. He makes his way to the palace. (Marche royale / Royal March).

The Devil is already at the palace disguised as a virtuoso violinist. Joseph turns over some cards and gets an air of confidence when they are all hearts. The Devil makes his presence known, clutching the violin to his chest, and taunts Joseph. The Narrator informs Joseph that the Devil still controls him because he retains the Devil's money, and if he can lose all of it to the Devil in a card game he will be free.

This the Soldier does. He then takes the violin and plays. (Petit concert / Little Concert). He triumphantly marches into the Princess's chambers where he plays another tune. Miraculously the music revives her, and she begins a sequence of dances. (Trois danses / Three Dances: Tango, Waltz, Ragtime).

As the two embrace the Devil arrives, for the first time undisguised. Joseph shields the Princess. He realizes he can defeat the Devil by playing his violin. (Danse du diable / Dance of the Devil). Unable to resist the music, the Devil begins to contort, is exhausted, and finally falls to the ground. Joseph takes the Princess's hand and together they drag the Devil away before falling into each other's arms. (Petit choral / Little Chorale).

But the Devil pops his head in and begins to torment the couple, warning that Joseph may not leave the palace without the Devil regaining control of him. (Couplets du diable / The Devil's Couplets).

Conclusion
Over the Grand choral / Great Chorale, the Narrator states the moral:

The work ends with Joseph crossing the frontier-post, a boundary not to be crossed, after being tempted by the ideal of having both his wife and his mother. The Devil is waiting as Joseph turns back to find his Princess, now gone. (Marche triomphale du diable / The Devil's Triumphant March): violin and percussion entwined in a rhythmic duel, the final measures played solely by the percussionist; here the score is marked decrescendo to the end, although this may be changed crescendo when performing the Suite.

Translations into English and German
The original French text by Ramuz has been translated into English by Michael Flanders and Kitty Black, and into German by the poet Hans Reinhart.

Musical influences 
Histoire du soldat shows Stravinsky's absorption of a wide range of musical influences: the pasodoble in the Marche royale; the tango, the waltz and ragtime, as played by Joseph to cure the Princess; klezmer in the instrumentation and textures; Luther's Ein feste Burg in the Petit choral; and Bach in the Grand choral. According to the musicologist Danick Trottier, these influences are linked to a certain extent to Stravinsky's experiences and first successes in the cosmopolitan Paris of the early 1910s, since the capital of France was a confluence-point for a variety of artists and musicians during La Belle Époque.

Performance history 
World premiere Lausanne, Switzerland, 28 September 1918, conducted by Ernest Ansermet.
UK Concert Suite: 1920, London, conducted by Ernest Ansermet.
Full staging, 1926, Newcastle upon Tyne, conducted by Edward Clark. Three further fully staged performances in London in July 1927.
France Full staging (by Diaghilev), Paris, 1924.
Germany 1924: Frankfurt, and Wiesbaden (conducted by Otto Klemperer).
US Ballet version: New York City Opera, New York State Theater, Lincoln Center: 1978: Directed by Frank Corsaro and Gardner Compton (who also choreographed), conducted by Imre Palló. Scenic and costume design by Victor Capecce; lighting design by Ken Billington. Barry Bostwick played the title role, and the Princess was portrayed by Mercedes Ellington. John Lankston and the New York City Opera Dancers completed the cast. (Presented on a triple bill with La voix humaine and The Impresario.)
Balletmaster Peter Martins created the Suite from L'Histoire du Soldat for New York City Ballet. The premiere was at the New York State Theater, Lincoln Center on 30 January 1981 with the original cast consisting of Darci Kistler, Kyra Nichols, Ib Andersen, Heather Watts, Jean-Pierre Frohlich, Victor Castelli, Bart Cook, and Daniel Duell. The Martins ballet was given again May 1987 and revived in May 1999 when it was reviewed by Jack Anderson.
Canada Narrated version: Montreal Festivals, 1949.
Staged version: Stratford Shakespearean Festival, 1955: directed by Douglas Campbell. Costume design by Clarence Wilson. Lillian Jarvis as the Princess, Marcel Marceau as the Devil, Douglas Rain as the Soldier, narrated by William Needles.

Recordings 
Anthony Nicholls (Narrator), Terence Longdon (Soldier), Robert Helpmann (Devil), Arthur Leavins (violin), Jack Brymer (clarinet), Gwydion Brooke (bassoon), Richard Walton (cornet), Sidney Langston (trombone), Edmond Chesterman (double bass), Stephen Whittaker (percussion), conducted by John Pritchard, based on Glyndebourne Opera production 1954 at Edinburgh Festival, LP HMV ALP 1377.
 L'Histoire du soldat (Suite). Igor Stravinsky conducts the Columbia Chamber Ensemble, 1961, issued as part of "Igor Stravinsky: The Recorded Legacy", Sony, 1991.
L'Histoire du soldat (Suite). Gennady Rozhdestvensky conducts a chamber ensemble [no name provided], Angel/Melodiya, 1964.
L'Histoire du soldat (Suite). Tashi (version for violin, clarinet, and piano), RCA Red Seal, 1977.
 Jean Cocteau (Narrator),  (Soldier), Peter Ustinov (Devil),  (Princess), studio ensemble, conducted by Igor Markevitch, Philips Records, 1962 production, recorded at Vevey, Switzerland.
Brian Phelan (Soldier), Robert Helpmann (Devil), Svetlana Beriosova (Princess), Melos Ensemble, film version 1964, Michael Birkett (director), Dennis Miller and Leonard Cassini (producers), Richard Marden (editor), BHE production.
Madeleine Milhaud (Narrator), Jean-Pierre Aumont (Soldier), Martial Singher (Devil), instrumental ensemble conducted by Leopold Stokowski, 1967, Vanguard Records, double album, sequential recordings in French and English.
Gérard Carrat (Narrator), François Berthet (Soldier), François Simon (Devil), conducted by Charles Dutoit, 1970, Erato ECD .88198 (this and the Cocteau/Ustinov Philips version listed above are generally considered the best recordings, the Philips being more theatrical – including a speaking part for the princess – but less realistic in terms of the diction of the characters).
Glenda Jackson (Narrator), Rudolf Nureyev (Soldier), Micheál Mac Liammóir (Devil), instrumental ensemble conducted by Gennady Zalkowitsch, Argo.
John Gielgud (Narrator), Tom Courtenay (Soldier), Ron Moody (Devil), Boston Symphony Chamber Players, 1975, Deutsche Grammophon.
Ian McKellen (Narrator), Sting (Soldier), Vanessa Redgrave (Devil), London Sinfonietta conducted by Kent Nagano, 1990, London: Pangea/MCA, ASIN B000009HYG.
Frank Zappa recorded the march from The Soldier's Tale on his live album Make a Jazz Noise Here (1991). The same melody was also used at the ending of "Soft-Sell Conclusion" on the second Mothers Of Invention album, Absolutely Free (1967). On 6 September 1972, Zappa narrated in a performance by the Los Angeles Philharmonic under Lukas Foss at the Hollywood Bowl; Ernest Fleischmann as devil and Tim Buckley as soldier.
Sally Goodwin (Narrator), Ron Bohmer (Soldier), Reed Armstrong (Devil), Solisti New York, conducted by Ransom Wilson, 1993, Chesky Records, also available as a download from HDtracks.
Aage Haugland, Royal Scottish National Orchestra, conducted by Neeme Järvi (CHAN9189), 1993
Carole Bouquet (Narrator), Guillaume Depardieu (Soldier), Gérard Depardieu (Devil), Shlomo Mintz (violin and conductor), Pascal Moragues (clarinet), Sergio Azzolini (bassoon), Marc Bauer (cornet), Daniel Breszynski (trombone), Vincent Pasquier (double bass), Michel Cerutti (percussion), CD (B000003I1K) 1997 Auvidis Valois France.
Jeremy Irons / The Columbia Chamber Ensemble / Igor Stravinsky and Robert Craft. New York: Sony BMG, 2007. 82876-76586-2
In 2018, Roger Waters recorded a version in which he narrates his adaptation of the story and portrays all characters, recorded with members of the Bridgehampton Chamber Music Festival, released on Sony Classical Masterworks.

Adaptations 
In 1983, Bil Baird created his final puppeteering work based on L'Histoire before his death in 1987.<ref>"Bil Baird and his marionettes are busy with Stravinsky now" by Mark Steinbrink, The New York Times, 26 June 1983</ref>
In 1984, animator R. O. Blechman created an animated version for PBS's Great Performances featuring Max von Sydow as the voice of devil. This production was released on VHS the next year and on DVD in 2004.
In 1993, United States novelist Kurt Vonnegut reworked the libretto into a tale about World War II Private Eddie Slovik, the first soldier in the United States military to be executed for desertion since the Civil War.
In 2002, Joan Sanmartí recorded a jazz arrangement version scored for a septet of electric guitar, tenor saxophone/clarinet/bass clarinet, trumpet/flugelhorn, cello, accordion, double bass, and drums, including solo improvisations by most of the interpreters.
In January 2006, Rebecca Lenkiewicz and Abdulkareem Kasid created a version set in Iraq and staged by Andrew Steggall at The Old Vic.
In 2008, Inuit writer Zebedee Nungak translated the libretto into Inuktitut for performance by the Montreal Symphony Orchestra's tour of Nunavik (the Inuit homeland in Quebec), conducted by Kent Nagano.

 References 
Notes

Sources

Further reading
Bailey, Kathryn. "Melodic Structures in the Overture and Scene-Music of Histoire du soldat". Canadian Association of University Schools of Music Journal/Association Canadienne des Écoles Universitaires de Musique Journal 4, nos. 1–2 (Fall 1974): 1–7.
Craft, Robert. "Histoire du soldat (the Musical Revisions, the Sketches, the Evolution of the Libretto)". The Musical Quarterly 66, no. 3 (July 1980): 321–38.
Loeffler, Peter. Die Geschichte vom Soldaten: Strawinsky, Ramuz, Auberjonois, Ansermet. Das Profil der Uraufführung in Lausanne im September 1918, rendered in German by Hans Reinhardt. Basel: Springer, 1994. .
Marti, Christoph. "Zur Kompositionstechnik von Igor Strawinsky: Das Petit concert aus der Histoire du soldat". Archiv für Musikwissenschaft 38, no. 2. (1981): 93–109.
 326 copies signed by author and artist. 73 black-and-white lithographs within the text and 2 on the wrappers. 100 pages + 2 leaves. A livre d'artiste printed on Arches paper and housed in a vellum and board folder and matching slipcase.
Vaccaro, Jean-Michel. "La musique dans l'Histoire du soldat". Voies de la création théâtrale 6 (1978): 55–76.
Zur, Menachem. "Tonal Ambiguities as a  Constructive Force in the Language of Stravinsky". The Musical Quarterly'' 68, No. 4 (October 1982): 516–526.

External links 
"K029 Soldier’s Tale", Annotated Kirchmeyer Catalog of works and work editions of Igor Stravinsky

Historia do Soldado, puppetry adaptation 

1918 compositions
Ballets by Igor Stravinsky
Ballets by Peter Martins
Compositions by Igor Stravinsky
Compositions for trumpet
Compositions with a narrator
Modernist compositions
Suites (music)
The Devil in classical music
Deal with the Devil
1918 ballet premieres